The 2nd Company Massachusetts Sharpshooters was a company of sharpshooters that served in the Union Army during the American Civil War. It was also known as the 2nd Andrew's Sharpshooters after the governor of Massachusetts, John Albion Andrew. The company was attached to the 22nd Massachusetts Infantry at the beginning of their term and operated together with that unit for its entire history of service. The 2nd Massachusetts Sharpshooters became part of the Army of the Potomac and saw combat in some of the largest battles of the war.

See also 

 Massachusetts in the Civil War
 List of Massachusetts Civil War units

Notes

References

 
 
 
 
 

Units and formations of the Union Army from Massachusetts
Military units and formations established in 1861
Military units and formations disestablished in 1864